The Fort Wayne Mad Ants are an American professional basketball team of the NBA G League based in Fort Wayne, Indiana, and are affiliated with the Indiana Pacers. The team plays their home games at the Allen County War Memorial Coliseum. The Mad Ants won their first and only championship in 2014, when the G League was known as the NBA D-League. In September 2015, the Indiana Pacers purchased the Mad Ants.

Team history

2007–12: Early years 
In April 2007, the NBA Development League (D-League) announced it was expanding to Fort Wayne for the 2007–08 season, with former AT&T President John Zeglis as the team's president and part owner. The team was poised to be the first minor league basketball franchise to play in Fort Wayne since the Fort Wayne Fury were disbanded after the folding of the Continental Basketball Association in 2001. The franchise held a team-naming contest on their website where fans could vote on one of the four finalists: Lightning, Fire, Coyotes, and Mad Ants, the latter name being a tribute to the city's namesake "Mad" Anthony Wayne.  

At the team's inception, the Fort Wayne Mad Ants were affiliated with the Detroit Pistons and Indiana Pacers. They finished the 2007–08 season, their first in the D-League, with a 17–33 record that put them in last place in the Central Division.   

The Mad Ants added the Milwaukee Bucks as their third affiliate for the 2008–09 season. They ended that season with a 19–31 record and posted three more under-.500 records in the next three years, failing to make the playoffs in their first five years of competition.

2012–15: Playoff success 
The Mad Ants added the Charlotte Bobcats, now the Hornets, as their fourth NBA affiliate before in the 2012–13 season. They made the D-League playoffs for the first time in 2013, losing to the Santa Cruz Warriors in the first round after going 27–23 in the regular season. 

The next year, the Mad Ants won their division with a 34–16 record and made it to the D-League Finals for the first time after beating the Sioux Falls Skyforce in the semifinal series. The Mad Ants defeated the Santa Cruz Warriors 2–0 in the Finals to claim their first D-League title. 

In 2014, as most NBA teams began exclusively partnering with or acquiring their own D-League teams, the Mad Ants made affiliate partnerships with the rest of the teams that did not have exclusive affiliates: the Atlanta Hawks, the Chicago Bulls, the Brooklyn Nets, the Denver Nuggets, the Los Angeles Clippers, the Minnesota Timberwolves, the New Orleans Pelicans, the Portland Trail Blazers, the Toronto Raptors, and the Washington Wizards. This put the Mad Ants' total number of NBA affiliates at 14 for the 2014–15 season. The Mad Ants made it to the D-League Finals again in 2015, but lost the championship series to the Santa Cruz Warriors in two games. By 2015, the Mad Ants were the only remaining independently owned team in the D-League, as the rest were owned and operated by an NBA team or a common parent organization.

2015–present: Pacers era 
In September 2015, Pacers Sports & Entertainment (PS&E) purchased the Mad Ants from owner and president John Zeglis and made the team the Indiana Pacers' one-to-one D-League affiliate, dropping the rest of the Mad Ants' partnerships. Brian Levy was named general manager by PS&E. 

In 2017, the Mad Ants rebranded and changed their colors to the same colors as the Pacers: navy blue, gold, cool gray and white. This was the same year that the NBA Development League was rebranded as the NBA G League following a sponsorship deal with Gatorade and the NBA.

After spending the 2020–21 season at the NBA G League single site in Orlando, Florida during the COVID-19 pandemic, the Mad Ants returned to their home court at the Allen County War Memorial Coliseum on November 6, 2021, playing their first home game in the venue in 608 days against the Windy City Bulls. This game also marked the start of the Mad Ants' 15th Anniversary season.

The Mad Ants are one of the three G League teams not to not undergo a name change since the team's inception in 2007, the others being the Rio Grande Valley Vipers and the Sioux Falls Skyforce.

Season-by-season results

Players

Current roster

Notable former players 
 Isaiah Jackson (2021–22), Indiana Pacers center
 Goga Bitadze (2019–21), Indiana Pacers center
 Jakarr Sampson (2019–20), Liaoning Flying Leopards forward 
 Hasheem Thabeet (2019–2020), former NBA center, second-overall pick in the 2009 NBA Draft
 Georges Niang (2016–17), Philadelphia 76ers forward
 Mike Muscala (2014–15), Oklahoma City Thunder center
 Noah Vonleh (2014), Boston Celtics forward
 Khris Middleton (2012–13), Milwaukee Bucks forward, 2021 NBA Champion, Olympic gold medalist
 Terran Petteway (born 1992), basketball player in the Israeli Basketball Premier League
Ben Moore (born 1995), basketball player in the Israeli Basketball Premier League
 Miles Plumlee (2012–13), former NBA center, first-round pick in the 2012 NBA Draft, Fort Wayne native
Alex Poythress (born 1993)
 Ron Howard (2007–10, 2011–14), 2014 NBA D-League MVP and "Mr. Mad Ant"
Russ Smith, former NBA player, currently plays in the Israeli Basketball Premier League

Head coaching history

Current and former NBA affiliates
Indiana Pacers (2007–present)
Detroit Pistons (2007–2015)
Milwaukee Bucks (2008–2015)
Charlotte Bobcats/Hornets (2012–2015)
Atlanta Hawks (2014–2015)
Brooklyn Nets (2014–2015)
Chicago Bulls (2014–2015)
Denver Nuggets (2014–2015) 
Los Angeles Clippers (2014–2015) 
Minnesota Timberwolves (2014–2015) 
New Orleans Pelicans (2014–2015)
Portland Trail Blazers (2014–2015)
Toronto Raptors (2014–2015)
Washington Wizards (2014–2015)

In popular culture
In the television series One Tree Hill, James Lafferty's character Nathan receives an offer to coach the Mad Ants in the episode "You've Dug Your Own Grave, Now Lie In It". The episode originally aired September 29, 2008 on The CW Network.
The Mad Ants were featured in the 'MyCareer' mode in NBA 2K19, a basketball game developed by Visual Concepts and published by 2K Sports.

See also

History of sports in Fort Wayne, Indiana

References

External links
Official website
Allen County War Memorial Coliseum website

 
Basketball teams in Indiana
2007 establishments in Indiana
Basketball teams established in 2007